Madilyn Bailey Wold (born September 2, 1992), commonly known as Madilyn Bailey and Madilyn, is an American singer, songwriter, musician, and YouTube personality. She has appeared on multiple TV live shows in France to promote her cover singles and she also promoted her original single "Tetris" on the American TV show Today in 2018. , she has about 9.5 million subscribers on YouTube.

Her debut original EP 'Bad Habit' was released in 2012. She released her first studio album 'Muse Box' in 2015 through PlayOn/Warner Music France. Her second original EP 'Wiser''' was released independently in July 2016. 

She held her first headlining show in Paris in 2018 and her first headlining full-band tour in China in 2019, she has also toured in US/CA twice with Boyce Avenue as a special guest.

 Biography 
Madilyn Bailey began her career shortly before graduating high school by covering popular songs and posting them on YouTube, gathering over 100 million views. In 2012, Bailey joined Keep Your Soul Records to assist with the production of her material and moved to Los Angeles in 2013.

Bailey toured the United States and Canada with Boyce Avenue in the second half of 2013. She later described it by saying "It was an amazing experience being on the road for the first time". She has stated that she has been inspired by Michelle Branch and Kina Grannis.

In 2015, her rendition of the song "Titanium", originally by David Guetta and Sia, gained airplay on Virgin Radio in France. This led to a recording contract with PlayOn in France, a label of Warner Music Group. The song charted in France and Belgium—as did the follow-up, a cover of Imagine Dragons' "Radioactive". In October 2015, Bailey released an album of covers in France, entitled Muse Box, supported by the single "Rude" feat. Flula. A fourth single, a cover of Cher's "Believe", appeared in early 2016.

In July 2016, she released a five track-EP of original material entitled Wiser.

In 2016, her cover of David Guetta and Sia's "Titanium" was featured on the Australian TV series Wanted.

She was picked in April 2018 as Elvis Duran's Artist of the Month. She was featured on NBC's Today show hosted by Hoda Kotb and Kathie Lee Gifford, broadcast nationally in the United States on April 20, 2018, where Bailey performed a live version of her single "Tetris".

In 2018, her original song "Drunk on a Feeling" was featured on the American action-drama TV series Station 19''.

In 2021, Madilyn appeared on the 16th season of America's Got Talent, performing an original song made out of hate comments, which had gained over 20 million views on YouTube. In her audition, she received 4 yeses from the judges. She moved onto the top 36, to perform a cover of David Guetta and Sia's "Titanium" in the Quarter Final 1. She got through to perform her original song "Red Ribbon" in the Semi Finals. She was eliminated during the Semi Finals.

Personal life
She was born in Boyceville, Wisconsin, to Greg Wold, who works for an advertising firm, and Heidi Wold. She has five siblings. Bailey began to play music and write songs at the age of seven. She played in the marching band of Boyceville High School and graduated in 2011. Before becoming an artist, Bailey worked as a certified nursing assistant. She is dyslexic.

In 2014, she married James Benrud.

Awards and nominations

Discography

Cover Albums

Cover Singles

*Did not appear in the official Belgian Ultratop 50 charts, but rather in the bubbling under Ultratip charts.

Original EPs

Original Singles

Writing credits

Vocal credits

References

External links

Official website

21st-century American women guitarists
21st-century American guitarists
21st-century American women singers
1992 births
American women pop singers
American women singer-songwriters
American pop guitarists
Guitarists from Wisconsin
Living people
People from Boyceville, Wisconsin
Musicians with dyslexia
Warner Music Group artists
America's Got Talent contestants
Singer-songwriters from Wisconsin